Jean-Charles Gervaise de Latouche (26 November 1715, in Amiens - 28 November 1782), was a French writer. He was a lawyer at the Parlement de Paris of the Ancien Régime.

The authorship of the licentious books Mémoires de Mademoiselle de Bonneval (1738), Histoire de Dom Bougre, Portier des Chartreux (1741), and possibly also Lyndamine, ou, L'optimisme des pays chauds (1778) has been attributed to him.

Works 
 Mémoires de Mademoiselle de Bonneval écrits par M***, 1738 at French Wikisource
 Histoire de Dom Bougre, portier des Chartreux, écrite par lui-même, Arles, Actes Sud, 1993  at French Wikisource

External links
 

1715 births
1782 deaths
18th-century French novelists
French male novelists
18th-century French male writers